Menneskekollektivet is the debut album by the Norwegian art pop duo Lost Girls, musicians Jenny Hval and Håvard Volden. It was released in March 2021 by Norwegian record label Smalltown Supersound.

Composition
While the duo's 2018 EP Feeling worked in art punk, Menneskekollektivet is "primarily a dance record" and pushes further into Hval's "electronic explorations".

Critical reception

Menneskekollektivet was welcomed with positive reviews upon its release. On Metacritic, it holds a score of 83 out of 100, indicating "universal acclaim", based on six reviews.

Sophie Kemp for Pitchfork called it "a warm-blooded exploration of the sensuality of the artistic process" and "as conceptually rich as anything Hval has ever done." It was given the website's "Best New Music" designation.

Accolades

Track listing

References

2021 albums
Smalltown Supersound albums